Nørre Galten is a village in Eastern Jutland, Denmark, a few kilometres north of Hadsten. Politically it is part of the Central Denmark Region and Favrskov Municipality. It has a population of 210 (1 January 2022).

References 

Towns and settlements in Favrskov Municipality